Vimala may refer to:

People
U Vimala (1899–1962), Burmese Buddhist monk
Vimalakka (born 1964), Indian balladeer
Vimala Devi (born 1932), Indian writer
Vimala Raman, Indian dancer
Vimala Rangachar, cultural activist
Vimala Thakar (1921–2009), Indian social activist

Other uses
 Vimalanatha, 13th Jain Tirthankara
Vimala College, a Christian college in Thrissur, India
Vimala's Curryblossom Cafe, Indian restaurant in North Carolina, United States
Vimala Temple, Hindu temple in Orissa, India
Vimala Nagar, Wayanad, a village in Kerala, India
Vimala (film), a 1960 Telugu film